Terry Crowley may refer to:

 Terry Crowley (baseball player)
 Terry Crowley (linguist)
 Terry Crowley (The Shield), fictional character in The Shield